Old Mother Riley Overseas is a 1943 British comedy film directed by Oswald Mitchell and starring Arthur Lucan, Kitty McShane and Anthony Holles. In the screenplay, Old Mother Riley relocates to Portugal.

Plot summary
Mother Riley is tricked out of her licence for a pub, and heads for Portugal to find her daughter who is working in the wine business. Along the way she is somehow mistaken for a famous pianist, but arrives in Portugal just in time to prevent her daughter from being kidnapped. She also manages to retrieve stolen port wine.

Cast
 Arthur Lucan ...  Mrs. Riley
 Kitty McShane ...  Kitty Riley
 Morris Harvey ...  Barnacle Bill
 Fred Kitchen ...  Pedro Quentos
 Sebastian Cabot ...  Bar Steward
 Magda Kun
 Anthony Holles
 Ferdy Mayne
 Freddie William Breach
 Bob Lloyd
 Paul Erickson
 Eda Bell
 Ruth Meredith

Critical reception
TV Guide said, "following the successful formula of Old Mother Riley in Paris, this less impressive series entry has Lucan traveling to Portugal."

References

External links

1943 films
1943 comedy films
Films directed by Oswald Mitchell
British comedy films
British black-and-white films
Films scored by Percival Mackey
Films shot at British National Studios
1940s English-language films
1940s British films